Chang Fei  (born Chang Yan-ming; 4 December 1951) is a Taiwanese singer and television personality.

Early life
He was born Chang Yan-ming in Taipei, Taiwan, on 4 December 1951, His eldest sister Chang Yan-qiong was a singer formerly known as Jenny Fei, who later became a buddhist nun known by the dharma name of Shi Heng Shu, better known as Heng Shu. He is the elder brother of ballad singer Fei Yu-ching.

Chang married a South Korean woman Zhao Cui-hua in 1975 and they had two sons, Chang Shao-ching and Chang Shao-huai. Chang and Zhao divorced in 1990.

Career
Chang Fei is the host of the variety show Variety Big Brother, and is also a singer who has recorded CDs.  He is associated with long-time friends including Frankie Kao and the late comedian Ni Min-jan and owns several successful restaurants. He is also one of the most celebrated wing surfers in the local surfing community. Known for his taste of the classical music and jazz, he has performed as a saxophone player. Many celebrities will remember his famous quote from the early TV show, "Comedian Bump Earth", saying Are you Happy? Yes We Are!. Fei is reportedly to be on his way to retirement, beating out his disciples such as Jacky Wu and Hu Gua. He planned for Kang Kang to be his successor. However, Kang Kang left Variety Big Brother before its final show.

Although Fei was rumored to be retiring, he is still active in making appearances on various Taiwanese variety shows.

References

External links

Chang Fei on sina.com
Warner music profile

1951 births
Living people
Musicians from Taipei
Taiwanese television personalities